Charles J. Kleingrothe, born Carl Josef Kleingrothe or Klein-Grothe, known as C. J. Kleingrothe (Krefeld, 1864 - 1925) was a German photographer who since 1889 (?) had a studio in Medan, Sumatra at the end of the 19th century and early 20th century. In 1891 (?) he partnered with the Swedish photographer H. Stafhell for ten years and photographed the landscapes and architecture as well as portraits. In 1901, the partnership ended and in 1902 Kleingrothe opened a studio on Kesawan street in downtown Medan and photographed agricultural subjects including tobacco, coffee, tea, rubber and palm oil cultivation, administration and transport, portraits and nudes.

External links

 Profile at RKD
  Fotografen.nl Kleingrothe, Carl J. (archived link)

References

Photographers from North Rhine-Westphalia
Photography in the Dutch East Indies
People from Krefeld
German emigrants to Indonesia